Pattu Saree was a Malayalam soap opera which launched on Mazhavil Manorama. Sadhika Venugopal played the protagonist of the show.

Plot
Pattu Saree depicts the life of Kanchi, a self-made business woman who owns a silk saree showroom. She adopts a son, believing her twin daughters were killed in a car accident. However, one of her daughters became a sales girl in her shop and later fell in love with her adopted son to marry him. However, Kanchi is not fond of this girl, Thamara, until she realizes and recognizes her to be her daughter. This happens when her husband rejoins the family, against the will of Kanchi, her mother and her prospective husband. Kanchi has serious ill feelings toward her husband, whom she holds responsible for all the losses in her life. One of the twin girls also joins the family. However, towards the end of the serial, Kanchi is finally reunited with her family of two girls and husband. She also realizes her mother's plotting against her husband which made them foes all these years. The family soon rejoins under the father and she hands over her responsibilities to her children and starts a new journey with her husband Rajarathnam.

Cast

Main 
 Sadhika Venugopal / Surya Mohan as Thamara
 Meena Kumari as Kanchi Amma
 Richard N. J.  as Abhijith Chettiyar  Abhikuttan
 Akash V H as Ajayan Chettiyar  Ajayankuttan
 Amritha Varnan as Mahalakshmi
 Neeraja as Veena

Recurring 
 Sarath Das as Hari Shankar
 Deepika as Varalakshmi Harishankar
 Soniya Baiju Kottarakkara as Prabha
 Amith as Rajarathinam
 Dinesh Panicker as Kochettan
 Azeez as Nellikkadan
 T. P. Madhavan as Madhavan
 Vijay Menon
 Sreelatha Namboothiri as Athai
 Mohan Ayroor
 Darshana Das as Varalakshmi
 Sreekala
 Devi Chandana
 Charutha Baiju
 Gopi as Gopi

Awards

References

External links
 

Malayalam-language television shows
Mazhavil Manorama original programming